Romeo Ortega, born in Mexico, is a Mexican-French control scientist and distinguished professor. He is head of the Adaptive and Nonlinear Control Systems Lab in St. Petersburg, Russia and full-professor at the Mexico Autonomous Institute of Technology (ITAM) in Mexico City.

Education

Career

Membership 
In 1990-1991 Romeo Ortega was a fellow of the Japan Society for Promotion of Science.
Since June 1992 Romeo Ortega is a member of the French National Researcher Council CNRS). 
Since 1999 he is a Fellow Member of the IEEE. From January 2020, Romeo Ortega is member of the Mexico National Researchers System (SNI) level 3.

Publications
Professor Ortega authored and co-authored more than 550 papers with more than 10000 citations. His h-index is 66 (July 2015).

See also
Adaptive control
Control theory

References

French computer scientists
Mexican computer scientists
Year of birth missing (living people)
Living people
Grenoble Institute of Technology alumni
20th-century Mexican engineers
21st-century Mexican engineers
20th-century French scientists
21st-century French scientists